Karabulak is a town in the Republic of Ingushetia, Russia, located on the Sunzha River (a tributary of the Terek),  north of the republic's capital of Magas. As of the 2010 Census, its population was 30,961.

History
The Cossack stanitsa of Karabulakskaya was founded in 1859. Urban-type settlement status was granted to it in 1962 and town status was granted in 1995.

In the 1990s, the town's population more than tripled, because of an influx of refugees from neighboring Chechnya.

Administrative and municipal status
Within the framework of administrative divisions, it is incorporated as the town of republic significance of Karabulak—an administrative unit with the status equal to that of the districts. As a municipal division, the town of republic significance of Karabulak is incorporated as Karabulak Urban Okrug.

Economy
A chemical factory is located in Karabulak.

Climate
Karabulak has a humid continental climate (Köppen climate classification: Dfa).

References

Notes

Sources

External links

Official website of Karabulak 
Karabulak Business Directory  

Cities and towns in Ingushetia